The Bush-Dubisson House is a historic house at 1500 South Ringo Street in Little Rock, Arkansas.  It is a two-story masonry structure, built out of red brick with a tile roof.  It has classical Prairie School features, including a broad hip roof with extended eaves, a single-story porch, part of which is open and part is topped by a balcony supported by large brick piers.  It was built in 1925 for Aldridge Bush, a prominent local African-American businessman, and was owned for many years by another, Daniel J. Dubisson.  It was constructed by S.E. Wiggin, a local African-American contractor.

The house was listed on the National Register of Historic Places in 1999.  A previous house built for Bush to a design by Charles L. Thompson, is also listed on the National Register as the Bush House; it stands at 1516 South Ringo.

See also
National Register of Historic Places listings in Little Rock, Arkansas

References

Houses on the National Register of Historic Places in Arkansas
Prairie School architecture
Houses completed in 1925
Houses in Little Rock, Arkansas
National Register of Historic Places in Little Rock, Arkansas